Ran Pethani Railway Station is located in Ran Pethani village, in Thatta district of Sindh province of the Pakistan.

See also
 List of railway stations in Pakistan
 Pakistan Railways

References

External links
 Ran Pethani Railway Bridge 

Railway stations in Thatta District
Railway stations on Karachi–Peshawar Line (ML 1)